Bonny Oaks Arboretum is an arboretum located at 6183 Adamson Circle, Chattanooga, Tennessee. It is open daily without charge.

The arboretum is a small round park in front of the Dent House, now the Hamilton County Agriculture Center, whose gardens and some buildings date from the mid-19th century. It contains 55 types of trees and shrubs, identified by common and scientific names, including the large willow oak which is over 100 years old.

See also
 List of botanical gardens in the United States

Arboreta in Tennessee
Botanical gardens in Tennessee
Geography of Chattanooga, Tennessee
Tourist attractions in Chattanooga, Tennessee
Protected areas of Hamilton County, Tennessee